Dorothy McKim is an American film producer, best known for Meet the Robinsons.. McKim and fellow producer Lauren MacMullan were nominated for an Academy Award for Best Animated Short Film for the 2013 film Get a Horse!.

She served as the inspiration for the character of Magee in the television special Prep & Landing.

References

External links

American film producers
Living people
American women film producers
Year of birth missing (living people)
Primetime Emmy Award winners
Walt Disney Animation Studios people